José Restrepo (born 25 August 1974) is a Colombian wrestler. He competed in the men's freestyle 48 kg at the 1996 Summer Olympics.

References

1974 births
Living people
Colombian male sport wrestlers
Olympic wrestlers of Colombia
Wrestlers at the 1996 Summer Olympics
Place of birth missing (living people)